The Pelt is the first poetry book/CD by American indie hip hop artist Doseone. It was released in 2003. The CD contains excerpts of the book read aloud by Doseone, in a style similar to the one heard on his previous album Slowdeath.

Track listing
 The Pelt (0:30)
 The Unraveling Arm Of An Emotional Boy (4:53)
 Earth To Rachel, Navels And Notes (6:53)
 The Following Section Has Been Omitted (0:06)
 Windows And Women... (4:00)
 ...Oh And Whales Too (1:01)
 The Following Section Has Been Omitted (0:27)
 Of B-Dreams And Medium Pieces (28:26)

References

Doseone albums